Roaldryggen is a mountain ridge in Sørkapp Land at Spitsbergen, Svalbard. It has a length of about 3.5 kilometers, and is located southwest of Vasil'evbreen. The highest peak on the ridge is 730 m.a.s.l. The ridge is named after polar explorer Roald Amundsen.

References

Mountains of Spitsbergen